North Shore Line could refer to one of several railway lines:

 Chicago North Shore and Milwaukee Railroad, United States
 North Shore railway line, Sydney, Australia
 North Shore Line (New York), a former trolley line on the north shore of Long Island
 North Shore Line (Singapore), a planned mass transit line in Singapore which was scrapped and succeeded by the Cross Island line.
 North Shore Branch, Staten Island
 North Shore Line, New Zealand, a proposed railway line in Auckland, New Zealand

See also 

 North Shore Branch
 North Shore Railroad (disambiguation)
 Shoreline (disambiguation)
 North Shore (disambiguation)
 South Shore Line (disambiguation)
 
 North (disambiguation)
 Shore (disambiguation)
 Line (disambiguation)